Ian Brody Hutzler (born April 20, 1971) is an American actor. He is best known for portraying Patrick Lockhart on Days of Our Lives. Hutzler has also appeared in 7th Heaven, She Spies, Birds Of Prey, Charmed, Las Vegas, Family Guy, and Ally McBeal.

Early life 
Ian Brody Hutzler was born on April 20, 1971, in Fairbanks, Alaska. He attended Michigan State University before relocating to Los Angeles.

Career
Hutzler played the role of Zachary Smith on Guiding Light from 1996 to 1997 and the role of Cody Dixon on The Young and the Restless from 1999 to 2004 before moving on to Days of Our Lives, where he played the role of Patrick Lockhart from 2004 to 2007. He has also made several television guest appearances on shows, such as The WB series Charmed and Angel and the short-lived 2000 NBC series, Titans. He also starred in the 2008 film Green Flash, along with Torrey DeVitto and Kristin Cavallari. In 2011, he played Navy Lieutenant Michael Jensen in NCIS. In 2012, he played Jason Sheridan in Ringer. In 2015, he appeared in the film Mega Shark vs. Kolossus.  He also works as a realtor.

Personal life
Hutzler married design and renovation expert Judith Curameng in 2012, and their daughter was born in 2014.

Filmography

References

External links

1971 births
American male soap opera actors
Living people
People from Fairbanks, Alaska